The United States Boys High School All-American Team is the United States' U-19 rugby team at the national level.  The Boys' High School All-Americans, sponsored by Aircraft Charter Solutions, are the best Junior Varsity (U17) and Varsity (U19) male rugby players from across the country, and compete as both 15s and Sevens squads.

Recent results
The following table shows the results of the U.S.  Boys High School All-American Team in official matches during the previous 24 months, as well as upcoming fixtures.

Management
Salty Thompson - Head Coach
Brendan Keane - Assistant
Scott Bracken - Assistant
JD Stephenson - Assistant

Roster
The following is the Roster for the 2016 Ontario Tour and the 2016 BC Tour.

References

External links
 www.usarugby.org

R